Amu Dar'ya is a town in Köýtendag District, Lebap Province, Turkmenistan, on the river of the same name opposite the town of Kerki. As of 1989, it had a population of 5,018.

Geography
Amu Dar'ya is located at an elevation of 265 meters on the banks of the Amu-Darya River.

Notable people
 
Recep Bazarov (born 1958), Turkmen statesman and politician

Transportation
Amu Dar'ya is on a branch of the Trans-Caspian railway that leads from Samarqand in Uzbekistan, through the far east of Turkmenistan, and then back to Termez in Uzbekistan and finally Dushanbe in Tajikistan. Amu Dar'ya is one of three major stations on this line in Turkmenistan, along with Köýtendag and Kelif.

The P-39 highway connects the city to Kerki across the Amu-Darya river by the Atamyrat-Kerkichi Bridge constructed Ukrainian builders. The P-37 highway connects the town to the nearby municipalities of Kerkichi and Dostluk, and farther east to Köýtendag and the border with Uzbekistan. The P-89 highway leads north to the Uzbek border town of Tallimarjon.

References 

Populated places in Lebap Region